Crawleyside is a village in County Durham, in England. It is situated to the north of Stanhope, in Weardale. In the 2001 census Crawleyside had a population of 170.

The Crawley Edge Cairns, in a field to the west of the village are a series of forty-two Bronze Age cairns.

References

External links

Villages in County Durham
Stanhope, County Durham